In enzymology, a succinate-semialdehyde dehydrogenase [NAD(P)+] is an enzyme that catalyzes the chemical reaction

succinate semialdehyde + NAD(P)+ + H2O  succinate + NAD(P)H + 2 H+

The 4 substrates of this enzyme are succinate semialdehyde, NAD+, NADP+, and H2O, whereas its 4 products are succinate, NADH, NADPH, and H+.

This enzyme belongs to the family of oxidoreductases, specifically those acting on the aldehyde or oxo group of donor with NAD+ or NADP+ as acceptor.  The systematic name of this enzyme class is succinate-semialdehyde:NAD(P)+ oxidoreductase. Other names in common use include succinate semialdehyde dehydrogenase (nicotinamide adenine, dinucleotide (phosphate)), and succinate-semialdehyde dehydrogenase [NAD(P)+].  This enzyme participates in 3 metabolic pathways: glutamate metabolism, tyrosine metabolism, and butanoate metabolism.

References

 Boyer, P.D., Lardy, H. and Myrback, K. (Eds.), The Enzymes, 2nd ed., vol. 7, Academic Press, New York, 1963, p. 203-221.
 
 

EC 1.2.1
NADPH-dependent enzymes
NADH-dependent enzymes
Enzymes of unknown structure